Volla is a comune (municipality) in the Metropolitan City of Naples in the Italian region Campania, located about  northeast of Naples.

Volla borders the following municipalities: Casalnuovo di Napoli, Casoria, Cercola, Naples, Pollena Trocchia.

Monuments and places of interest 

 Church of the Immaculate Conception and of San Michele (1975)
 Masseria of Monteoliveto Grande
 Remains of the castle. Only the perimeter walls remain, as well as the round arches and the quadrangular tower.

References

External links
 Official website

Cities and towns in Campania